Methanesulfonic acid (MsOH) or methanesulphonic acid (in British English) is an organosulfuric, colorless liquid with the molecular formula  and structure . It is the simplest of the alkylsulfonic acids. Salts and esters of methanesulfonic acid are known as mesylates (or methanesulfonates, as in ethyl methanesulfonate). It is hygroscopic in its concentrated form. Methanesulfonic acid can dissolve a wide range of metal salts, many of them in significantly higher concentrations than in hydrochloric acid (HCl) or sulfuric acid.

History and Preparation / Manufacturing
The first commercial production of MSA, developed in the 1940s by Standard Oil of Indiana (USA), was based on oxidation of methylsulfide by O2 from air. Although inexpensive, this process suffered from a poor product quality and explosion hazards. 

In 1967, the Pennwalt Corporation (USA) developed a different process for methylsulfide (as an water-based emulsion) oxidation using chlorine. followed by extraction-purification. In 2022 this chlorine-oxidation process was used only by Arkema SA (France) for making high-purity MSA. This process is not popular on a large scale, because it co-produces large quantities of hydrochloric acid. 

Between years 1970 and 2000 MSA was used only on a relatively small-scale in niche markets (e.g., in the microelectronic and electroplating industries since the
However, this situation changed around 2003, when BASF launched commercial production of MSA in Ludwigshafen based on a  modified version of the aforementioned air oxidation process, using dimethyldisulfide instead of methylsulfide. The former is produced in one step from methanol from syngas, hydrogen and sulfur. 

An even better (lower-cost and environmentally friendlier) process of making methanesulfonic acid was developed ca. 2016 by Grillo-Werke AG (Germany). It is based on a direct reaction between methane and oleum at ca.  50 °C and  100 bar in the presence of a sulfonyl peroxide initiator.  This technology was acquired and commercialized  by BASF in 2019.

Applications

Since ca. 2000 methanesulfonic acid has become a popular replacement for other acids in numerous industrial and laboratory applications, because it is:

(1) a strong acid,

(2) has a low vapor pressure (see boiling points in the "Properties" inset),

(3) is not an oxidant or explosive, like nitric, sulfuric or perchloric acids.

(4) is liquid at room temperature, 

(5) soluble in many organic solvents,

(6) forms water-soluble salts with all inorganic cations and with most organic cations,

(7) does not form complexes with metal ions in water,

(8) its anion, mesylate, is non-toxic and suitable for pharmaceutical preparations.

A the closely related p-toluenesulfonic acid (PTSA) is solid. 

Methanesulfonic acid can be used in the generation of borane (BH3) by reacting methanesulfonic acid with NaBH4 in an aprotic solvent such as THF or DMSO, the complex of BH3 and the solvent is formed.

Electroplating
Solutions of methanesulfonic acid are used for the electroplating of tin and tin-lead solders. It is displacing the use of fluoroboric acid, which releases corrosive and volatile hydrogen fluoride.

Methanesulfonic acid is also a primary ingredient in rust and scale removers. It is used to clean off surface rust from ceramic, tiles and porcelain which are usually susceptible to acid attack.

See also
 Trifluoromethanesulfonic acid - the more acidic trifluoro analogue

References

Sulfonic acids
Reagents for organic chemistry
Acid catalysts
Organic compounds with 1 carbon atom